League tables for teams participating in Kakkonen, the third tier of the Finnish Soccer League system, in 2005. Kakkonen was reduced to 3 groups of 14 teams for season 2006.

League tables

Southern Group, Etelälohko 

NB: FJK, Forssa withdrew on May 24, their 3 matches were annulled.

NB: JJK II, promoted from Division Three, withdrew and Ponnistus took their place.

Eastern Group, Itälohko 

NB: Jyväskylä United withdrew, FC Vaajakoski took their place.

Western Group, Länsilohko

Northern Group, Pohjoislohko 

NB: Because OLS were promoted to Division One, Division Two North was played with 11 teams.

Promotion Playoff

First Legs
Klubi-04               1-0 JIPPO
SalPa                  1-2 VIFK

Second Legs
JIPPO                  2-0 Klubi-04
VIFK                   1-1 SalPa

JIPPO and VIFK promoted, Klubi-04 and SalPa to division one/division two playoff.

Division One/Division Two Playoff

First Legs
SalPa                  0-4 Hämeenlinna
Klubi-04               2-1 VG-62

Second Legs
Hämeenlinna            3-1 SalPa
VG-62                  3-2 Klubi-04

Klubi-04 promoted, VG-62 relegated. Hämeenlinna remain at second level.

Relegation playoff

First Legs
Ponnistus              0-2 FCV
Tervarit               0-2 Virkiä

Second Legs
FCV                    1-1 Ponnistus
Virkiä                 4-3 Tervarit

Ponnistus and Tervarit relegated, FCV and Virkiä remain at third level.

Footnotes

References and sources
Finnish FA, Suomen Palloliitto 

Kakkonen seasons
3
Fin
Fin